Clabron Howard Blevins (June 4, 1910 – February 14, 1986) was an American baseball third baseman in the Negro leagues. He played with the Little Rock Grays in 1932 and the Homestead Grays in 1936. He also played with the Oakland Larks of the West Coast Baseball League in 1946.

References

External links
 and Seamheads

Homestead Grays players
Little Rock Grays players
Oakland Larks players
1910 births
1986 deaths
Baseball players from San Antonio
Baseball third basemen
20th-century African-American sportspeople